Cultura Géminis  is a Peruvian football club, playing in the city of Comas, Lima, Peru.

History
The club was founded on the October 29, 1967 under the name of  Club Cultural Deportivo Géminis in the city of Comas, Lima.

In 2010 Copa Perú, the club classified to the National Stage when defeated Atlético Pilsen Callao, La Peña Sporting and Deportivo Municipal in the Regional Stage; but was eliminated by Deportivo Hospital.

In 2011 Copa Perú, the club classified to the National Stage, but was eliminated by Universidad Nacional de Ucayali in the round of 16.

Honours

Regional
Región IV: 1
Winners (1): 2010
Runner-up (1): 2011

Liga Departamental de Lima: 0
Runner-up (1): 2010

Liga Distrital de Comas: 1
Winners (1): 2014
Runner-up (1): 2010

See also
List of football clubs in Peru
Peruvian football league system

External links
 Club Cultural Deportivo Géminis en BlogSpot
 Club Cultural Deportivo Géminis en Facebook
 Deportivo Géminis Máster Profesional
 Academia CARF Géminis en Facebook

References

Association football clubs established in 1967
1967 establishments in Peru
Football clubs in Lima